The 1932 United States presidential election in Kansas was held on November 8, 1932 as part of the 1932 United States presidential election held throughout all forty-eight contemporary states. State voters chose nine electors, or representatives to the Electoral College, who voted for President and Vice-President.

Background
Kansas had been a powerfully Republican state during the 1920s (as it had been during its first quarter-century of statehood), although it did not possess the isolationist sentiment found in Appalachia or the Upper Midwest. In 1928 large-scale anti-Catholic voting swept a state substantially part of the Ozark “Bible Belt”, so that whereas Kansas had been less anti-Democratic than more northerly Plains states in 1920 and 1924, it became Herbert Hoover’s best state in the entire nation at the next election cycle.

However, Hoover’s first term saw disaster on two fronts for the Great Plains: the economic calamity of the Great Depression was combined with a major drought in the region from 1930 onwards. Consequently, agricultural states like Kansas, which had already been hit by declining prices during the 1920s, were severely affected by a wave of foreclosures and outmigration. Roosevelt, despite the strong Republican bent of the state, saw a major opportunity in the Plains States, visiting Kansas, Nebraska and South Dakota extensively during his campaign in September. Outside of the prosperous Northeast, Hoover’s attempts at apologetics were a complete failure, with the result that Roosevelt carried every state west of the Appalachians. Kansas – the home state of incumbent Vice-President Curtis – was Hoover’s strongest state west of the Mississippi, but he still lost ninety-one counties and almost twenty-eight percent of the vote vis-à-vis his overwhelming triumph against Smith in 1928.

This remains the only occasion ever in which the Democratic presidential nominee has carried Chautauqua County. , this also remains the last time that the following counties have voted for a Democratic presidential candidate: Jefferson, Clay, Coffey, Dickinson, Elk, Jackson, Jewell, Linn, Logan, Marshall, Norton, Phillips, Pottawatomie, Republic, Smith, Wabaunsee, Wallace, Washington, Wilson and Woodson.

Results

Results by county

See also
 United States presidential elections in Kansas

Notes

References

1932
Kansas